Venedictoffia karsholti is a species of moth of the subfamily Arctiinae first described by Hervé de Toulgoët in 1991. It is found in Peru.

References

Moths described in 1991
Arctiini